Christmas in Compton is a 2012 Christmas comedy film starring Keith David and Omar Gooding. It was directed by David Raynr.

Plot 
Derrick is an aspiring music producer whose major accomplishment is the discovery of DJ Killionaire, an artist now generating millions for record executive Tommy Maxell. Derrick feels cheated by Maxell when he does not receive his believed share of the profits due to fine print in the contract. His lack of income leads to a fight with his father Big Earl, the owner of a children's academy as well as a Christmas tree lot in Compton, California, during the week before Christmas.

Big Earl suffers a heart attack and during his recovery he signs documents giving Derrick co-ownership of the house and the Christmas tree lot in an attempt to teach him responsibility. When Maxell threatens steal female trio Sugar Stuff out from Derrick's management, Derrick seeks revenge on Maxell by posing as an exterminator and robbing a $300,000 pink diamond ring from Maxell's house. He attempts to sell the stolen ring through the intermediary Delicious, a pawn shop owner, but the first prospective buyer is a local criminal who attempts to rob the ring and has to be chased off. Urgently in need of money in order to extend Sugar Stuff's contract, Derrick puts up the Christmas tree lot as collateral for a $150,000 loan from loan shark Ernesto Martinez, who demands repayment and an additional $25,000 in interest by Christmas Eve. Tommy Maxell buys the loan from Ernesto Martinez in order to take the Christmas tree lot as collateral and also hires criminals to steal back the ring from Delicious. Derrick and his friends go on a promotional frenzy for Sugar Stuff by selling their CD all over Compton in order to push their contract price up so that Maxwell will be convinced to tear up the loan in return for being allowed to sign Sugar Stuff to his label. They get involved in a car crash with a local hustler who listens to their story in prison and is moved to help them because his nephew attends Big Earl's academy. His crew rapidly distributes Sweet Stuff's CDs to the local radio stations and distributes their music on iTunes, quickly earning over $100,000. Big Earl forces Derrick to sign back ownership of the Christmas tree lot to him, but the papers are actually for ownership of Sweet Stuff. Big Earl negotiates with Maxell, who agrees to build a community center on the lot and employ Derrick as a producer for the artists on the label in return for ownership of the lot and the ability to sign Sweet Stuff to his label. Big Earl says that he will simply take the money that was made that day and buy another lot with it.

Cast 

 Ayo Adeyemi as African Drummer
 Charlotte Ayanna as Ginger
 Kamilah Barrett as Dancer
 Alycia Bellamy as Shante
 Jayda Brown as Sierra
 Orlando Brown as Tyrone
 Christopher Carroll as Butler
 Luke Christopher as himself
 Porscha Coleman as Kendra Campbell
 Melanie Comarcho as Quanita
 Keith David as Big Earl
 Marcos De Silvas as Ernesto Martinez
 Kristinia DeBarge as Lola
 Fefe Dobson as Kim
 Michael Duncan as Michael Duncan
 Omar Gooding as Derrick Hollander
 Cynthia Graham as Mrs. Hubbard
 Reegan Haynes as Dancer
 Edwin Hodge as Pookie
 Spencer Hubbard as DJ Killionaire
 Budd Jackson as Heckler
 Leslie Jones as Tiny
 Don "Magic" Juan as Donald Campbell
 Charles Kim as Steve Ho
 Arif S. Kinchen as Squeaky
 Buddy Lewis as Mr. Hubbard (as Roland "Buddy" Lewis)
 Karen Y. McClain as Mrs. Jones (as Karen McClain)
 Jonathan McHugh as Policeman #2
 "Big" LeRoy Mobley as Audience Heckler
 Luis Moncada as Mexican Driver
 Miguel A. Núñez Jr. as Delicious
 Zion Otano as Leon
 Jay Perry as Police Officer (as Jermanne Perry)
 Sheryl Lee Ralph as Abuta
 Evan Rayner as E-Ray
 Darryl Alan Reed as Sly
 Eric Roberts as Tommy Maxell
 Robair Sims as Stunt Skater
 Emiliano Torres as Tre
 Matthew Willig as Charlie
 Malin Yhr as Lost White Woman
 Heather Rae Young as Paulette

Release 
The film was released in the United States on November 9, 2012.

Reception 
The film received mixed reviews. In a positive review, John Anderson of Variety.com wrote, "With a first-rate cast led by Keith David and Sheryl Lee Ralph, generously funny dialogue and a supporting cast capable of crisp comic timing, writer-director David Raynr's feature is warm and likable enough to jumpstart the holiday movie season." In a negative review, Frank Scheck of The Hollywood Reporter called the film "a lump of coal in filmgoers' stockings." Noting the early release date, Scheck went on to write, "Forget Christmas, this risible early holiday release won't make it until Thanksgiving."

See also 
 List of black films of the 2010s
 List of Christmas films

References

External links 
 

2012 films
2010s Christmas comedy films
African-American comedy films
American Christmas comedy films
American independent films
2012 independent films
2012 comedy films
2010s English-language films
Films directed by David Raynr
2010s American films